and often shortened to , is a Japanese animation company. The studio's name has a double meaning in Japanese: "Tatsu's child" (Tatsu is a nickname for Tatsuo) and "sea dragon", the inspiration for its seahorse logo. Tatsunoko's headquarters are in Musashino, Tokyo.

History 
The studio was founded in October 1962 by mangaka and anime pioneer Tatsuo Yoshida and his brothers Kenji and Toyoharu (better known by his pen name "Ippei Kuri").
 
The studio's first production was the 1965 TV series Space Ace. Since then many figures in the anime industry have worked with Tatsunoko, including Mizuho Nishikubo, Hiroshi Sasagawa, Koichi Mashimo, Katsuhisa Yamada, Hideaki Anno (Tatsunoko provided animation work on the Neon Genesis Evangelion TV series), and Kazuo Yamazaki. Sasagawa is notable for bringing his fondness for comedy animation to the forefront in Tatsunoko series such as the Time Bokan (1975) franchise. The company later licensed Macross to Harmony Gold, who then produced Robotech.

Takara acquired Tatsunoko on June 3, 2005 after purchasing an 88 percent stake and made the company a subsidiary. Production I.G was established in 1987 as I.G. Tatsunoko, a branch for the production of Zillion led by Mitsuhisa Ishikawa.

In 2009, Tatsunoko announced that it would collaborate with Marvel Comics on a joint television project and other ventures. IG Port announced on June 2, 2010 that its subsidiary, Production I.G, had purchased an 11.2 percent stake in Tatsunoko. Production I.G president Mitsuhisa Ishikawa became a part-time director of the studio.

Talent agency Horipro announced on February 23, 2013 that it had acquired a 13.5 percent stake in Tatsunoko. At Anime Expo 2013, Sentai Filmworks announced a deal to license and release some of Tatsunoko's titles, including Gatchaman and Casshan. Nippon TV announced on January 29, 2014 that it had purchased a 54.3 percent stake in Tatsunoko and adopted the company as its subsidiary.

In 2017, two short films titled Pandora to Akubi were released. These were the first works produced under Tatsunoko's "Bakken Record" label, which was officially established in April 2019.

Main productions

1960s

1970s

1980s

1990s

2000s

2010s 

 Tatsunoko vs. Capcom: Ultimate All-Stars (Nintendo Wii) (January 26, 2010)
 Hutch the Honeybee: Yuki no Melody (2010; co-production with Group TAC)
 Yozakura Quartet: Hoshi no Umi (2010; co-production with KMMJ Studios)
 Princess Resurrection (2010; remake of original TV series)
 [C]: The Money of Soul and Possibility Control (Fuji TV) (2011)
 Sket Dance (TV Tokyo) (2011–2012)
 Pretty Rhythm: Aurora Dream (TV Tokyo) (2011)
 Pretty Rhythm: Dear My Future (TV Tokyo) (2012–2013; co-production with DongWoo A&E)
 Ippatsu-Hicchuu! Devander (2012; OVA in celebration of Tatsunoko Productions' 50th anniversary)
 Namiuchigiwa no Muromi-san (MBS) (2013)
 Pretty Rhythm: Rainbow Live (TV Tokyo) (2013–2014; co-production with DongWoo A&E)
 Gatchaman Crowds (NTV) (2013)
 Yozakura Quartet: Hana no Uta/Yozakura Quartet: Tsuki ni Naku (2013)
 Triple Combination: Transformers Go! (2013)
 Robotech: Love Live Alive (2013) (Robotech version of the MOSPEADA OVA: Love Live Alive)
 Wake Up, Girls! (2014; co-production with Ordet)
 Ping Pong (Fuji TV) (2014)
 PriPara (TV Tokyo) (2014–2017; co-production with DongWoo A&E)
 Psycho-Pass 2 (Fuji TV) (2014)
 Yatterman Night (MBS) (2015)
 Gatchaman Crowds insight (NTV) (2015)
 PriPara Mi~nna no Akogare Let's Go PriPari (TV Tokyo) (2016)
 Transformers: Combiner Wars (2016; co-production with Hasbro Studios and Machinima Inc.)
 Time Bokan 24 (YTV /NTV) (2016–2017; co-production with Level-5)
 Infini-T Force (NTV) (2017, co-production with Digital Frontier)
 Idol Time PriPara (TV Tokyo) (2017–2018; co-production with DongWoo A&E)
 Transformers: Titans Return (2017–2018; co-production with Hasbro Studios and Machinima Inc.)
 Transformers: Power of the Primes (2018; co-production with Hasbro Studios and Machinima Inc.)
 Kiratto Pri Chan (TV Tokyo) (2018–2021; co-production with DongWoo A&E)
 The Price of Smiles (2019, Tatsunoko's 55th anniversary work)
 King of Prism: Shiny Seven Stars (2019)
 Ninja Box (2019–2020; co-production with C2C)

2020s 

 Hakushon Daimaō 2020 (YTV) (2020, co-production with Nippon Animation)
 Joran: The Princess of Snow and Blood (NTV) (2021)
 Idol Land PriPara (2021)
 Muteking the Dancing Hero (TVO) (2021, co-production with Tezuka Productions)
 Waccha PriMagi! (TV Tokyo) (2021–2022, co-production with DongWoo A&E, the final Pretty Series to date until it was ended on TV in 2022)
 Exception (Netflix) (2022, co-production with 5 Inc.)
 Ippon Again! (TV Tokyo) (2023)
 The Legend of Heroes: Trails of Cold Steel – Northern War (2023)
 Pole Princess!! (TBA)
 Turkey! (TBA)

Co-productions 

 Once Upon a Time...Man (1978–1981; produced by Procidis)
 Superbook (1981–1982; co-production with Christian Broadcasting Network)
 The Flying House (1982–1983; co-production with Christian Broadcasting Network)
 Super Dimension Fortress Macross (MBS) (1982–1983; produced by Studio Nue and Artland)
 Super Dimension Fortress Macross: Do You Remember Love? (1984; produced by Studio Nue and Artland)
 Genesis Climber MOSPEADA: Love Live Alive (1985; co-production with Artmic)
 Robotech (1985; co-production with Harmony Gold USA and Big West)
 Robotech II: The Sentinels (1986; co-production with Harmony Gold USA)
 Anmitsu Hime (Fuji TV) (a.k.a. Anmitsu Hime: From Amakara Castle) (1986–1987; produced by Studio Pierrot)
 Super Dimension Fortress Macross: Flash Back 2012 (1987; co-production with Studio Nue and Artland)
 Time Travel Tondekeman (Fuji TV) (a.k.a. Time Quest Tondekeman!) (1989–1990; produced by Ashi Productions)
 Robin Hood (1990–1992; co-production with Mondo TV)
 The Legend of Snow White (1994–1995; co-production with Mondo TV)
 Neon Genesis Evangelion (TV Tokyo) (1995–1996; co-production with Gainax)
 The Story of Cinderella (1996; co-production with Mondo TV)
 ''Simple 1500 Series Vol. 24: The Gun Shooting (1999; contributed with animated cutscens)

Anime studios founded by former animators 

 Ashi Productions/Production Reed (since 1975)
 Artmic (1978-1997) (defunct)
 Pierrot (since 1979)
 J.C.Staff (since 1986)
 Production I.G (since 1987)
 Animation 21 (since the 1990s)
 Xebec (1995-2019) (defunct)
 Radix Ace Entertainment (1995-2006) (defunct)
 Bee Train Production (since 1997)
 Actas (since 1998)
 TNK (since 1999)

Notes

References

External links 

 
 

 
Japanese companies established in 1962
Animation studios in Tokyo
Mass media companies established in 1962
Japanese animation studios
Musashino, Tokyo
Video game companies of Japan
Video game development companies
Video game publishers